Thomas (the Tank Engine) & Friends is a children's television series about the engines and other characters working on the railways of the Island of Sodor, and is based on The Railway Series books written by the Reverend W. Awdry.

This article lists and details episodes from the fifth series of the show, which was first broadcast in 1998. This series was narrated by Michael Angelis for audiences in the United Kingdom, while Alec Baldwin narrated episodes for audiences in the United States.

In the United States, this season was first aired in 1999 on Fox Family. This was the first season of the series that was not aired on PBS Kids.

This was the first season that used digital filming, and the last produced by The Britt Allcroft Company.

Production

Stories
The show's staff had decided since Series 3 that most of the best stories of The Railway Series had been adapted, the rest involving too many new characters or closely resembling previous stories. With Series 5, the decision was made to write a full series of original, staff-written stories. One reason for this was producer Britt Allcroft's desire to create a theatrical Thomas the Tank Engine movie. She requested that director David Mitton show off his modelling skills.

Some inspiration for the stories came from a former LMR manager named David Maidment. In 1997, Maidment met with Steven Wright about the possibility of supporting the Railway Children charity, and while Wright told him the series' staff commonly received such requests, they would consider. During their meeting, Maidment relayed stories about his railway experiences working in South Wales and as the manager at  station. Days later, Maidment received a call asking if he would allow some of his stories to be used as material – the stories from The Railway Series were frequently based on true events, and Allcroft and Mitton preferred this. Maidment agreed, and was also asked to review each story to make sure that the railway in the show operated realistically. As a result, Maidment received writing credit alongside Allcroft and Mitton. 10,000 pounds ($14,406 in U.S. money) was donated to the Railway Children for his work.

These stories are amongst those adapted:
 "A Better View for Gordon" - the Granville-Paris Express ran through the buffer stop, across the station concourse, and crashed through the station wall; landing in the Place de Rennes below.
 "Baa!" – a ram invades a railway station and attacks some vandals; additionally, the idea of a "Best Kept Station" competition.
 "James and the Trouble with Trees" – rain erodes an embankment, causing a tree to slide down and stand upright on the tracks.
 "Double Teething Troubles" – a diesel stalls while banking a train.
 "A Surprise for Percy" - a runaway in the Garw Valley that occurred during David Maidment's time as Area Manager at Bridgend.
 "Busy Going Backwards" - a couple of "hair-raising" runaway trains in the Tondu valleys that occurred during David Maidment's time as Area Manager in South Wales.
 "Gordon and the Gremlin" – bathwater in a luxury coach splashes around the compartment.

The design for each new character would be chosen by David Eves, and given to David Mitton for approval.

Filming
Mitton shot 2,700 slates for Series 5, the most of any of the series he shot for Thomas, and music from seasons 3 and 4 play while recording the audio to 5.1 surround sound while the final cut uses stereo audio .

The filming for this season lasted from September 1, 1997 to April 30, 1998.

Broadcast
Previously Thomas had only appeared in the US as a segment on the TV show Shining Time Station, but Series 5 aired in the US as part of the half-hour Storytime with Thomas program. Each episode would include a new Series 5 episode, an episode of Britt Allcroft's Magic Adventures of Mumfie, and a Series 4 episode narrated by George Carlin, with music videos and footage of Day out with Thomas in between.

Episodes

Characters

Introduced

 Cranky ("Cranky Bugs")
 The Horrid Lorries ("Horrid Lorry")
 Old Slow Coach ("Thomas, Percy & Old Slow Coach")
 Old Bailey ("Haunted Henry")
 Derek ("Double Teething Troubles") (not named)
 'Arry (not named) and Bert (does not speak) ("Stepney Gets Lost")
 Dowager Hatt ("Gordon & the Gremlin") (not named)
 Bertram ("Toby's Discovery") (does not speak)
 Butch ("Horrid Lorry") (does not speak)
 Tiger Moth ("Sir Topham Hatt's Holiday") (does not speak)
 Thumper ("Rusty & the Boulder") (does not speak)

Recurring cast

 Thomas
 Edward
 Henry
 Gordon
 James
 Percy
 Toby
 Duck
 Oliver
 Bill and Ben
 BoCo
 Mavis
 Stepney
 Skarloey
 Rheneas
 Rusty
 Duncan
 Annie and Clarabel
 Troublesome Trucks
 Toad
 Terence
 Bertie
 Harold
 George
 Caroline
 The Fat Controller
 Lady Hatt
 Stephen Hatt
 Bridget Hatt
 Mrs. Kyndley
 Jem Cole
 Farmer Trotter (not named)
 S.C.Ruffey (not named)
 Peter Sam (does not speak)
 Henrietta (does not speak)
 Donald (cameo)
 Trevor (cameo)
 The Vicar of Wellsworth (cameo)
 The Refreshment Lady (cameo)
 Nancy (cameo)
 Duke (portrait cameo)

Home Video Releases
All twenty-six episodes were released on VHS in the UK by Video Collection International in four volumes. The last volume was also released on DVD, making it the very first DVD release of the show.

The entirety of Series 5 was released on VHS in June 2002, and on DVD in November 2004 as part of a boxset before being reissued on its own in February 2007. Series 5 episodes have also been released as part of other DVD and VHS releases in the United Kingdom.

Notes

References

1998 British television seasons
Thomas & Friends seasons